Jacob Crull (born 3 October 1997) is an Austrian footballer who plays as a defender for Forward Madison FC in USL League One.

Career

Youth, college, and amateur
Crull spent time with the Indiana Fire academy, before playing college soccer at Spring Arbor University between 2016 and 2019. Crull was named two-time NAIA All-American for two consecutive years, and scored 23 goals and tallied 50 assists in 83 appearances for the Cougars.

While at college, Crull played in the USL League Two with Charlotte Eagles in 2018 and 2019.

Professional
On 14 January 2020, Crull signed with USL League One side Union Omaha. He made his debut on 1 August, starting against North Texas SC.

After two seasons in Omaha, Crull signed with FC Tucson on 21 December 2021.

On 7 December 2022, Crull signed with another USL League One team, Forward Madison FC.

References

External links
Jacob Crull - 2019 - Men's Soccer at SAU Cougars

1997 births
Living people
American soccer players
Association football defenders
Charlotte Eagles players
Soccer players from Indiana
Union Omaha players
FC Tucson players
Forward Madison FC players
USL League One players
USL League Two players
People from Carmel, Indiana
Spring Arbor Cougars men's soccer players
Footballers from Lower Austria